This Is Pop is a Canadian documentary television series, which aired on CTV Television Network in 2021. Produced by Banger Films and similar to the format of the company's earlier documentary series Metal Evolution, Rock Icons and Hip-Hop Evolution, the eight-episode series presents a history of pop music.

The series was designed thematically rather than chronologically, so that episodes could be viewed in any order; when the series was added to Netflix for international distribution, it was designed so that whichever episode the service's algorithms deemed most likely to be of interest to each individual viewer was recommended first.

The series premiered March 6, 2021 on CTV, and was released internationally by Netflix in June.

The series received two Canadian Screen Award nominations at the 10th Canadian Screen Awards in 2022, for Best Biography or Arts Documentary and Best Direction in a Documentary Series (Jared Raab for "Auto-Tune").

Episodes

References

External links

2021 Canadian television series debuts
2020s Canadian documentary television series
2020s Canadian music television series
CTV Television Network original programming